The 38th Arizona State Legislature, consisting of the Arizona State Senate and the Arizona House of Representatives, was constituted in Phoenix from January 1, 1987, to December 31, 1988, during the two years of Evan Mecham's term as Governor of Arizona, and the first year of Rose Mofford's term as governor after Mecham's impeachment. Both the Senate and the House membership remained constant at 30 and 60, respectively. The Republicans gained a seat in the Senate, giving them a 19-11 majority, while the Democrats gained to seats in the house, decreasing the Republican majority to 36–24.

Sessions
The Legislature met for two regular sessions at the State Capitol in Phoenix. The first opened on January 12, 1987, and adjourned on May 19, while the Second Regular Session convened on January 11, 1988, and adjourned sine die on July 1.

There were three Special Sessions, the first of which was convened on January 21, 1987, and adjourned on January 25; the second convened on June 29, 1987, and adjourned sine die on July 1; and the third convened on July 20, 1987, and adjourned sine die on July 22.

State Senate

Members

The asterisk (*) denotes members of the previous Legislature who continued in office as members of this Legislature.

House of Representatives

Members 
The asterisk (*) denotes members of the previous Legislature who continued in office as members of this Legislature.

References

Arizona legislative sessions
1987 in Arizona
1988 in Arizona
1987 U.S. legislative sessions
1988 U.S. legislative sessions